Shaheed Benazir Bhutto City University  or SBBCU  is a private degree awarding Institution located in Karachi, Pakistan. The University was established in 2013 with the aim to provide quality education.

Faculties and Departments 
Department of Business Administration & Commerce
Department of Science & Technology
Department of Art & Design
Department of Education

See also
 Shaheed Benazir Bhutto Dewan University in Karachi
 Shaheed Benazir Bhutto University of Veterinary & Animal Sciences in Sakrand, Sindh
 Shaheed Benazir Bhutto University (Sheringal) in Dir, Khyber Pakhtunkhwa
 Shaheed Benazir Bhutto University (Shaheed Benazirabad) in Shaheed Benazirabad, Sindh
 Shaheed Benazir Bhutto Women University, previously known as the Frontier Women University, in Peshawar, Khyber Pakhtunkhwa
 Shaheed Mohtarma Benazir Bhutto Medical University in Larkana, Sindh, previously known as Chandka Medical College
 Mohtarma Benazir Bhutto Shaheed Medical College
 Shaheed Benazir Bhutto Medical College

References

Universities and colleges in Karachi
Private universities and colleges in Sindh
Memorials to Benazir Bhutto